Leptolalax tamdil is an anuran amphibian belonging to the family Megophryidae. It is so far reported only from Tam Dil lake, Mizoram, India. It is a small frog, but medium-sized among Leptolalax species;  the male measuring 32.3 mm, and female 31.8 mm. The species is diagnosed with unique features such as eyelids with tubercles, distinct tympanum and supratympanic folds, undilated toe tips with dermal fringes, long hind limbs, and distinct color patches.

References

External links 
 Wikispecies
 AmphibiaWeb

tamdil
Endemic fauna of India
Frogs of India
Amphibians described in 2010